"Get It While It's Hot" is a song by Nodesha, from her self-titled debut studio album. It was released on October 28, 2003.

Background and composition
"Get It While It's Hot" was written and produced by both Jimmy Jam and Terry Lewis for Nodesha's self-titled debut studio album. It derives from the musical genre of R&B, and samples the song "I Want Your Love" by the American band Chic. Eamonn McCusker of The Digital Fix called it a "stomping partner" to "Bootylicious" by American girl group Destiny's Child. The song contains "breathless" vocals from Nodesha which are against a backing track that has R&B and disco genres.

Reception

Critical response
"Get It While It's Hot" received positive reviews from music critics. An editor from Billboard described it as a "cool, sleek midnight party jam", that according to them, "offers the best sexy groove-and-sway since Justin Timberlake's "Rock Your Body"." They went on to praise Nodesha as talented, while elaborating that she has a "hit on her hands". According to the same editor, "the Jam & Lewis stamp is reminiscent enough of Janet Jackson" to give the song "built-in familiarity". Eamonn McCusker of The Digital Fix felt that "Get It While It's Hot" "really opens the album", and went on to write the track as "clearly being the album's best moment".

Commercial performance
"Get It While It's Hot" debuted and peaked at number 45 on the Australian Singles Chart. In Belgium, the song peaked at number 26 on both the Flanders and Wallonia singles charts. The song reached the top twenty on the singles chart in the Netherlands, where it peaked at number 18. "Get It While It's Hot" peaked at number 96 in Germany. It also debuted and peaked at number 55 on the UK Singles Chart for the issue dated November 1, 2003.

Charts

References

2003 debut singles
Songs written by Jimmy Jam and Terry Lewis
Song recordings produced by Jimmy Jam and Terry Lewis
2003 songs